HMCS Stratford was a  that served in the Royal Canadian Navy during the Second World War. The minesweeper saw action in the Battle of the Atlantic and the Battle of the St. Lawrence. In March 1945 Stratford collided with another ship and was rendered unusable. The minesweeper was broken up in 1946. She was named after the city of Stratford, Ontario.

Design and description
They came in two versions powered by different engines; those with a diesel engines and those with vertical triple-expansion steam engines. Stratford was of the latter design and was larger than her diesel-engined cousins. She had a complement of 6 officers and 77 enlisted.

Stratford had two vertical triple-expansion steam engines, each driving one shaft, using steam provided by two Admiralty three-drum boilers.

Stratford was armed with a single quick-firing (QF) 12-pounder 12 cwt HA gun mounted forward. The ship was also fitted with a QF 2-pounder Mark VIII aft and were eventually fitted with single-mounted QF 20 mm Oerlikon guns on the bridge wings. Those ships assigned to convoy duty had two depth charge launchers and four chutes to deploy the 40 depth charges they carried.

Service history
Stratford was ordered to be built as part of the Royal Canadian Navy's 1941–42 shipbuilding programme. The minesweeper's keel was laid down on 29 October 1941 by Davie Shipbuilding and Repairing Co. Ltd. at Lauzon, Quebec. The ship was launched on 14 February 1942 and commissioned into the Royal Canadian Navy on 29 August at Toronto.

After arriving at Halifax, Nova Scotia, Stratford was assigned to Newfoundland Force. With that unit, the ship was used as convoy escort throughout the war. In December 1944, she underwent a refit at Dartmouth. After its completion she traveled to Bermuda to work up from 15 February to 18 March 1945. During her return from Bermuda, Stratford collided with the destroyer  in the approaches to Halifax on 11 March 1945. Her forecastle was damaged significantly and as a result of this, she remained inactive until being paid off on 4 January 1946. She was placed on the disposal list in 1946 and sold for scrap. The ship was broken up in 1946.

See also
List of ships of the Canadian Navy

References

Notes

Citations

Sources

External links
 Haze Gray and Underway
 ReadyAyeReady.com

 

Bangor-class minesweepers of the Royal Canadian Navy
Ships built in Quebec
1942 ships
World War II minesweepers of Canada